Video on Trial is a Canadian television comedy series. It premiered on Much, then known as MuchMusic, on August 15, 2005, and aired on the network until July 6, 2014 for a total of 250 episodes.

Video on Trial features music videos being humorously critiqued in a manner akin to a courtroom trial. The show's tongue-in-cheek manifesto, as announced in its original opening sequence, is seeing to it that "all music videos are brought to justice". A typical half-hour episode features five music videos being "tried" by a panel of five personalities acting as jurors.

Series overview

Episodes

Season 1 (2005–06)

Season 2 (2006–07)

Season 3 (2007–08)

Season 4 (2008–09)

Season 5 (2009–10)

Season 6 (2010–11)

Season 7 (2011–12)

Season 8 (2013–14)

Season 9 (2014)

References

Lists of Canadian comedy television series episodes
Lists of non-fiction television series episodes